Lewis Township is an inactive township in New Madrid County, in the U.S. state of Missouri.

Lewis Township was established in 1906, taking its name from Lilbourn Lewis, an early settler.

References

Townships in Missouri
Townships in New Madrid County, Missouri